Falam is a town in north-western Burma (Myanmar) near Burma's western border with the Indian state of Mizoram. The town was founded by Taisun tribe.  The British arrived to Falam in 1892, and became an important base for British rule of the Chin Hills. After the formation of Chin State, it was the capital city until the administrative offices were moved to Hakha in 1974. It is still the regional governor of Falam District and of Falam Township. Falam is the headquarters of several important organizations, such as the Chin Baptist Convention (CBC). The population, as of 2014, is 9,092 (male:4266; female: 4826).

The first school established in Chin State is the No.1 Basic Education High School in Falam. Many of the buildings in Falam reflect the British occupation and its former status as the state capital.  The main road (Malay-Falam-Hakka) in the Chin mountains travel through Falam.

Historical perspective

The name Falam originated from Fa-hlam, from Taisun language of one of the tribes in Chin. Falam was a village created and founded by the Taisun tribe. Taisun was one of the strongest tribes in northern Chin hills and was the leading tribe collaborated with other tribes against the British rule in Chin history.

Climate

Ministries and government organizations
Many federal agencies maintain offices in Falam, such as Forestry, Health, Agriculture, Customs and Education.

Television
MRTV
Myawaddy TV
Myanmar International television formerly MRTV-3
MRTV-4

Radio
Myanmar Radio National Service

References

External links

Satellite map at Maplandia.com
Current weather in Falam
 Falam blog (English section)

Township capitals of Myanmar
Populated places in Chin State